Zhang Baosheng (1960 – 3 August 2018) was a Chinese qigong grandmaster during the peak of qigongs popularity (so called "qigong fever") in China. Along with Yan Xin, he played a key role in bringing qigong into the Chinese public consciousness.

Biography
A miner born in Benxi, Liaoning Zhang was born in 1960. Drawing on Chinese media reports, Palmer writes that Zhang was called on by the local police to assist in solving criminal cases.

Some high-ranking Communist Party leaders in Beijing grew curious at reports of Zhang's alleged powers, and Zhang was one of the "Healers with Extraordinary Powers" invited into the Zhongnanhai leadership compound to treat the daughter-in-law of General Chen Geng.

On 18 May 1982, Zhu Runlong, editor-in-chief of Ziran magazine, introduced Zhang to Marshal Ye Jianying, who had masterminded the overthrow of the Gang of Four after the death of Mao. Zhang was purported to have correctly 'smelled' the contents of messages written by Ye on folded slips of paper. From his wheelchair, Ye was reported to have "exclaimed his amazement and his support for Extraordinary Powers research."

Zhang died in Beijing on 3 August 2018.

In popular culture
In the Hong Kong film God of Gamblers Returns, the minor protagonist Cheung Po-Sing bearing a reference to Zhang is similarly reputed for allegedly possessing supernatural powers and is similarly recruited by the Chinese police for factfinding investigations. It is eventually revealed, that Cheung Po-Sing's ability has never been real, and the deceptive myth has been elaborately started by the protagonist in order to trick the antagonist into relying on a nonexistent supernatural power for cheating in a high-stakes poker game. The movie was released at the peak of hype surrounding Zhang's alleged supernatural abilities.

References

1960 births
2018 deaths
Qigong practitioners
People from Nanjing